McDowell High School is a public high school located in the Western North Carolina town of Marion. The school has approximately 1,700–1,800 students. It is the only high school in McDowell County. The school was built in 1971, and has its own student-run newspaper, the Iliad, and literary magazine, The Muses (formerly known as the Aurora).  McDowell High's yearbook finishes the trilogy of MHS publications, and is dubbed The Odyssey. Also there is now a T.V. show on YouTube entitled "MHS Titan News".

Alma mater 
The first official performance of the McDowell High "Alma Mater" was on November 11, 1976, during a McDowell High School Band Concert. The first live performance of the McDowell High "Alma Mater" took place during a football game in the fall of 1976. The words were composed by Mrs. Alice Ostrom, a noted North Carolina poet, and Angela Israel, a student of Captain Ostrom. The musical score was composed by Capt. Ralph K. Ostrom, Ret. In addition to having served as band director at Marion High, Captain Ostrom studied with the United States Army Band and was director of the Tenth Division Band Training School.

Athletics 

McDowell High School sports teams are known as the Titans. The school has had success in both men's and women's basketball. In the 2006–07 season, the Men's squad advanced to the final four in the state. The women's team won the NC 4A State Championship in the 1990–91 season, and were runners up in 2003–04.

Notable alumni 
 Greg Holland (2004), MLB pitcher, 2015 World Series champion and 3x All-Star selection
 Dwayne Ledford (1995), former NFL center
 Sara McMann (1998), silver medalist at the 2004 Summer Olympics in women's freestyle wrestling; currently a professional mixed martial arts fighter competing in the UFC's bantamweight division
 Orlando Melendez (1997), professional basketball player, also played with the Harlem Globetrotters

References

External links 
 
 MHS News Website
 Mhs Titan Band Website
 Website for The Iliad

Public high schools in North Carolina
Schools in McDowell County, North Carolina
Educational institutions established in 1971
1971 establishments in North Carolina